A total solar eclipse occurred on September 21, 1922. A solar eclipse occurs when the Moon passes between Earth and the Sun, thereby totally or partly obscuring the image of the Sun for a viewer on Earth. A total solar eclipse occurs when the Moon's apparent diameter is larger than the Sun's, blocking all direct sunlight, turning day into darkness. Totality occurs in a narrow path across Earth's surface, with the partial solar eclipse visible over a surrounding region thousands of kilometres wide. The greatest eclipse occurred exactly at perigee.

Totality started in Ethiopia, Italian Somaliland (today's Somalia), and passed British Maldives and Christmas Island in the Straits Settlements (now in Australia) in the Indian Ocean, and Australia. Two large scientific expeditions investigated Einstein's theory of relativity.

Related eclipses

Solar eclipses 1921–1924

Saros 133

References

External links 
 Fotos of Solar Corona September 21, 1922

 1922 Solar Eclipse in Australia
 Wallal: The 1922 Eclipse Expedition
 Photographs from the Wallal Australia expedition from the Lick Observatory Records Digital Archive, UC Santa Cruz Library's Digital Collections 

1922 09 21
1922 09 21
1922 in science
September 1922 events